The Sporting Instinct is a 1922 British silent drama film directed by Arthur Rooke and starring Lilian Douglas, Joseph R. Tozer and Mickey Brantford.

Cast
 Lilian Douglas as June Crisp  
 Joseph R. Tozer as Jerry West  
 Mickey Brantford as Tony  
 Tom Coventry as The Burglar  
 Betty Chapman as His Wife  
 Somers Bellamy as The Captain 
 Hetty Chapman 
 Vivian Gosnell 
 Howard Symons 
 Billy Vernon

References

Bibliography
 Low, Rachael. History of the British Film, 1918-1929. George Allen & Unwin, 1971.

External links
 

1922 films
1922 drama films
British drama films
British silent feature films
Films directed by Arthur Rooke
British black-and-white films
1920s English-language films
1920s British films
Silent drama films